Wangyefu (Chinese: , 王爷府镇) is a town in the Harqin Banner, Chifeng, Inner Mongolia Autonomous Region, China. It is 67 kilometres south of Chifeng. According to the 2010 census, the population is around 30,000.

Monuments

The Ka La Qin Palace of the Ka La Qin princes was constructed in 1679. It is one of the earliest and largest palaces of Inner Mongolia. Currently, it is a museum.

References

Populated places in Inner Mongolia
Villages in China